Leslie George Rich (December 29, 1886 – October 1969) was an American competition swimmer who represented the United States at the 1908 Summer Olympics in London.  Rich won a bronze medal as a member of the third-place U.S. team in the men's 4×200-meter freestyle relay, together with teammates Harry Hebner, Leo Goodwin and Charles Daniels.  Individually, he finished fourth in the men's 100-meter freestyle.

See also
 List of Olympic medalists in swimming (men)

References

External links
  Leslie Rich – Olympic athlete profile at Sports-Reference.com

1886 births
1969 deaths
American male freestyle swimmers
Olympic bronze medalists for the United States in swimming
Sportspeople from Somerville, Massachusetts
Swimmers at the 1908 Summer Olympics
Medalists at the 1908 Summer Olympics